Zemer is an Arab local council in the Central District of Israel. It is located in the Arab Triangle area, between Baqa al-Gharbiyye and Bat Hefer on Road 574. Zemer is the result of a merger of four villages – Bir al-Sika, Ibtan, Marja and Yama - in 1988.

History
At Ibtan, potsherds dating from the Hellenistic, Roman and Byzantine period have been found.

Archaeological work in Yama brought to light settlement remains ranging from the Pre-Pottery Neolithic B (PPNB) to the Ottoman period.

Bronze Age Yaham
Middle Bronze Age II findings from Yama have been tentatively identified to belong to the ancient site of Yaham. Yaham was mentioned in Egyptian sources regarding pharaohs Thutmose III and Shoshenq I. The 15th century BCE annals describing the campaign of Thutmose III against a coalition of Canaanite city-states recount how the pharaoh camped at Yaham before marching on through the pass of Aruna (today's Wadi Ara), at whose exit he attacked and captured the city of Megiddo.

Mamluk period
In 1265, two of the villages were mentioned among the estates which the Mamluk sultan Baibars granted his emirs after he had defeated the Crusaders:  The whole of Ibthan (Bathan) was given to his emir 'Alam al-Din Sanjar al-Halabi al-Salihi, while Yamma was divided equally between the emirs Saif al-Din Itamish al-Sa'di and Shams al-Din Aqsunqur.

Ottoman period
Yama and Ibtan appeared in  Ottoman  tax registers compiled in 1596, in the Nahiyas of Qaqun and Jabal Sami, respectively, of the Nablus Liwa. Yama had a population of 18 Muslim households and 5 bachelors, while Ibtan was indicated as empty even though it paid taxes.

In 1882, in the PEF's  Survey of Western Palestine, only  Khurbet Ibthan was noted, with "traces of ruins and a well."

British Mandate
In the 1922 census of Palestine conducted by the British Mandate authorities, Bir al-Sikka had a population of 36,  Ibthan 56 and Yamma 48, all Muslims.

Prior to 1948, all four villages were administratively related to the modern-day Palestinian town of Deir al-Ghusun.

Modern Israel
Zemer's population at the end of 2009 was 5,700, and its jurisdiction is 8,203 dunams. The population increased to 6,375 in 2014. The mayor of Zemer is Yassin Harzalla.

References

Bibliography

  
  

 
 

 

 pp. 439-440

External links
Welcome To Bir al-Sikka
Welcome To Kh. Ibthan
Welcome To al-Marja
 Welcome To Khirbat Yamma
Survey of Western Palestine, Map 11:    IAA, Wikimedia commons 

Arab localities in Israel
Triangle (Israel)
Local councils in Central District (Israel)